A blastema (Greek βλάστημα, "offspring") is a mass of cells capable of growth and regeneration into organs or body parts. The changing definition of the word "blastema" has been reviewed by Holland (2021). A broad survey of how blastema has been used over time brings to light a somewhat involved history. The word entered the biomedical vocabulary in 1799 to designate a sinister acellular slime that was the starting point for the growth of cancers, themselves, at the time, thought to be acellular, as reviewed by Hajdu (2011, Cancer 118: 1155-1168). Then, during the early nineteenth century, the definition broadened to include growth zones (still considered acellular) in healthy, normally developing plant and animal embryos. Contemporaneously, cancer specialists dropped the term from their vocabulary, perhaps because they felt a term connoting a state of health and normalcy was not appropriate for describing a pathological condition. During the middle decades of the nineteenth century, Schleiden and Schwann proposed the cell theory, and Remak and Virchow insisted that cells can only be generated by division of existing ones. Consequently, the conception of the blastema changed from acellular to cellular. More specifically, the term came to designate a population of embryonic cells that gave rise to a particular tissue. In short, the term blastema started being used to refer to what modern embryologists increasingly began calling a rudiment or Anlage. Importantly, the term blastema did not yet refer to a mass of undifferentiated-looking cells that accumulates relatively early in a regenerating body part. For instance, Morgan (1900), does not use the term even once in his classic book, “Regeneration.” It was not until the eve of World War 1 that Fritsch (1911, Zool. Jb. Zool. Physiol. 30: 377-472) introduced the term blastema in the modern sense, as now used by contemporary students of regeneration.

During the last century, blastemas were thought to be composed of undifferentiated pluripotent cells, but recent research indicates that in some organisms blastemas may retain memory of tissue origin. They are typically found in the early stages of an organism's development such as in embryos, and in the regeneration of tissues, organs and bone.

Some amphibians and certain species of fish and two species of African spiny mice can produce blastemas as adults. For example, salamanders can regenerate many organs after their amputation, including their limbs, tail, retina and intestine. Most animals, however, cannot produce blastemas.

Limb regeneration
When the limb of the salamander is cut off, a layer of epidermis covers the surface of the amputation site. In the first few days after the injury, this wounded epidermis transforms into a layer of signaling cells called the Apical Epithelial Cap (AEC), which has a vital role in regeneration. In the meantime, fibroblasts from the connective tissue migrate across the amputation surface to meet at the center of the wound. These fibroblasts multiply to form a blastema, the progenitor for a new limb.

Blastema cells can differentiate into any cell type with the exception of neurons. This means axons which are cut can be regrown by blastema cells, but if the soma of a neuron is damaged then a new neuron is unable to be created. As a result, neural organs cannot be regenerated.

Formation 

As stated above, there are several different types of organisms that can utilize a regenerative blastema as an adult. These organisms include urodele amphibians, zebrafish, and planarian flatworms as major creatures of study. In flatworms, the formation of a blastema needs adult stem cells that are called neoblasts for any type of regeneration to occur.  Flatworms use these undifferentiated cells for regeneration after paracrine factors can provide signals from the surface of the wound. The cells in the blastema are also referred to as clonogenic neoblasts (cNeoblasts) that are able to move to the site of the wound and reform the tissue. In urodele amphibians, studies suggest that dedifferentiation of cells leads to the formation of a blastema that is able to form multiple tissue types after the amputation of their tails and wound healing occurs. In zebrafish, and in general, it seems as if experts are still uncertain of what truly forms the blastema. However, two common theories that have often been expressed are cell dedifferentiation and the recruitment of stem cells to the wound site.

Signaling pathways 

There are several different signaling pathways that have been shown to be involved with limb regeneration through the formation of the blastema. In flatworms, studies suggest that after using RNA interference Smad-beta-catenin-1 was found to set up the anterior-posterior axis. Inhibitions to this results in reversed polarity across the blastema. Urodeles use hedgehog for dorsal-ventral patterning of their regenerating tail and its surrounding tissue. This was suggested by its inhibition leading to reduced blastemas. Zebrafish seem to use IGF signalling in limb regeneration as its inhibition led to clues of them being required for blastema function.

References

Further reading

Animal developmental biology